Tigrillos de Chetumal is a Mexican football club that plays in the Liga TDP. The club is based in Chetumal, Mexico. The club was founded on August 5, 1992 in the  Tercera División de México.

Roster

Competitive record

See also
Football in Mexico

Notes

External links
Official Page

References 

Football clubs in Quintana Roo
Association football clubs established in 1992
1992 establishments in Mexico
Chetumal